Aristida californica is a species of grass known by the common names California threeawn and Mojave threeawn. It is native to the Mojave Deserts and Sonoran of northern Mexico and California and Arizona.

Description 
Aristida californica is a clumpy, hairy grass forming bushy tufts up to about 40 centimeters tall in its sandy habitat. The inflorescence contains hard spikelets with a long beak at the tip and awns up to 4.5 centimeters long.

External links
Jepson Manual Treatment: Aristida californica var. californica
USDA Plants Profile - Aristida californica
Grass Manual Treatment;  Aristida californica

Californica
Native grasses of California
Flora of the California desert regions
Flora of Northwestern Mexico
Flora of Arizona
Grasses of Mexico
Grasses of the United States
Flora without expected TNC conservation status